María Martín-Romero, 5th Countess of Castillo Fiel (in full) (13 May 1856 – 26 November 1904), was a Spanish noblewoman.

María Martín-Romero was born in Madrid, the daughter of don Felix Martín y Romero (Superior Chief of Civil Administration [a high-level civil servant], Commander of the Order of Charles III, Secretary of HCM [Her Catholic Majesty]) and of Matilde de Godoy di Bassano y Crowe, 4th Countess of Castillo Fiel (Paris, 1830 – Madrid, 1901).

Marriage and children
On 7 December 1871, in Málaga, she married don Eduardo Antonio Crespo y Gálvez del Postigo (18 December 1838 - 8 November 1893), Alcalde of Málaga and Gentleman of the Chamber of HCM [His Catholic Majesty], and had three sons and one daughter:

Alfonso Isabel Crespo y Martín-Romero, 6th Count of Castillo Fiel (18 February 1873 - ?), married in Madrid, on 8 May 1905 doña Isabel Gil-Delgado y Pineda (6 July 1870 - 24 January 1917), daughter of the Counts of Berberana, and they had an only son: 
Carlos Crespo, 7th Count of Castillo Fiel (1 June 1911 – 8 November 1963)
Fernando Isabel Crespo y Martín-Romero (Málaga, 13 September 1874 - ?), married at Constantina, Seville, on 13 September 1903 doña María del Carmen García-Castrillón:
Eduardo Crespo y García-Castrillón, 8th Count of Castillo Fiel (? – Madrid, 29 May 1989)
María del Carmen Crespo y García-Castrillón
María Serafina Crespo y Martín-Romero (Madrid, 26 February 1883 - ?), married in Madrid, on 25 April 1904 don Nicolás de Medina y Pardo de Donlebún:
Cecilia de Medina y Crespo
Luis de Medina y Crespo
Luis María Crespo y Martín-Romero (Madrid, 16 July 1885 - ?), married doña María de la Cámara:
Fernando Crespo y de la Cámara

Sources

1856 births
1904 deaths
Spanish countesses
Maria 05
Maria 05